MX Superfly featuring Ricky Carmichael, released as MX Super Fly in PAL regions, is a motorcross racing game developed by Pacific Coast Power & Light and published by THQ for the Xbox, PlayStation 2, and GameCube.  It is the second installment of THQ's MX trilogy and a sequel to MX 2002 featuring Ricky Carmichael, garnering professional motorcross racer Ricky Carmichael's endorsement like its predecessor.

THQ released a third MX game in 2004, titled MX Unleashed and developed by its newly acquired subsidiary Rainbow Studios, the eventual creator of the MX vs. ATV series that serves as a crossover with Sony's ATV Offroad Fury series.

Gameplay
Players are able to create a male or female MX rider of their own and play in either two modes: racing or freestyle. The former consists of races against opposing racers controlled by artificial intelligence, while the latter consists of levels taking place in various environments where the player must independently accomplish certain challenges. It is also possible to play with a friend in split screen multiplayer, and the Xbox version exclusively featured downloadable content consisting of extra soundtracks, riders and bikes that could be purchased from the Xbox Live service.

Reception

The GameCube and PlayStation 2 versions received "generally favorable reviews", while the Xbox version received above-average reviews, according to the review aggregation website Metacritic.

References

External links
 

2002 video games
GameCube games
MX vs. ATV
PlayStation 2 games
Racing video games
THQ games
RenderWare games
Video games featuring protagonists of selectable gender
Xbox games
Video games developed in the United States
Multiplayer and single-player video games